Mount Brice is a mountain  west of Mount Abrams in the Behrendt Mountains, Palmer Land. It was mapped by the United States Geological Survey from surveys and from U.S. Navy air photos, 1961–67, and named by the Advisory Committee on Antarctic Names for Neil M. Brice, a radioscience researcher in this area at Camp Sky-Hi, summer 1961–62.

References 

Mountains of Palmer Land